Blood Red Ochre is a novel by Canadian writer Kevin Major, published in 1989.

References

1989 Canadian novels